Mariam [Meriam] Yahia Ibrahim Ishag or Maryam Yaḥyā Ibrahīm Isḥaq (مريم يحيى إبراهيم إسحق, born 3 November 1987 in Al Qadarif state, Sudan), is a Sudanese religious freedom activist and public speaker. Meriam Ibrahim was arrested during her second pregnancy for apostasy and gave birth to a girl in prison on 27 May 2014. Mariam Ibrahim's case is part of a wider problem of persecution of Christians in Sudan.

Overview
Meriam Ibrahim was born to a Muslim father, who left her Ethiopian Orthodox mother to raise her from early childhood. She was raised in her mother's faith and married a Christian man; the marriage certificate has been published.  Meriam Ibrahim was reportedly turned in to the authorities by one of her relatives, who claimed Mariam was committing adultery by marrying Daniel Wani, a Christian. She was sentenced to death on 15 May 2014, for allegedly committing apostasy from Islam, meaning that she was accused of changing religion from Islam to a different (or no) religion. Although Meriam Ibrahim said she has always been a Christian, the prosecution claimed she should have followed the faith of her absent father, and demanded, with the support of the judge, that she abandon her Christian faith, and assent to belief in her father's faith, Islam.

She was given three days to convert, but refused, arguing that she had been a Christian all her life, and could not rescind or alter her genuine personal faith at the request of a court. Her husband, Daniel Wani, appealed the sentence on both of their behalf. On 24 June 2014 Meriam Ibrahim was released on the order of a Sudanese appeal court. The following day, as she and her family were to board a plane to the United States, they were arrested and taken from the airport to Khartoum for questioning following a tip-off to the police by her half-brother. The US Ambassador was summoned in protest at the granting of an exit visa, described by the Sudanese Foreign Ministry as 'a criminal violation'. 
Meriam Ibrahim was freed again on 26 June 2014 and took refuge in the United States embassy with her family. After extensive negotiations to enable her to leave Sudan, Meriam Ibrahim arrived in Rome on 24 July 2014 on an Italian government plane.

Background
Because Islamic law does not allow marriages between Muslim women and non-Muslim men, Meriam Ibrahim's marriage to a Christian man was considered void by the court, based on its belief that she should not have been raised as a Christian, or chosen that faith.  Therefore, the court argued that, although a lifelong Christian, she should notionally be treated as a Muslim, and that the marriage to the Christian man was not valid. She was therefore also sentenced to receive 100 lashes for adultery, in spite of the sexual relations having been only with her husband, with the flogging to be administered some time in advance of being hanged. Moreover, her 20-month-old son was also imprisoned, and was initially denied all contact with his father, who would never have been permitted to raise him. Three of the boy's four grandparents – both his paternal grandparents, and his maternal grandmother – were Christian from birth, as were his parents – but the authorities have stated that as the absentee maternal grandfather that he never met was a Muslim, he therefore could not legally be raised by his Christian father.

In response, Meriam Ibrahim said that she has always been a Christian and never committed apostasy. Her half-brother, Al Samani Al Hadi Mohamed Abdullah, admitted he had instigated the charges against her and maintained she should be executed. Meriam Ibrahim's husband and her lawyers have alleged that her half-brother and half-sister had turned her in because they wanted to take over Meriam Ibrahim's successful businesses, which included a hair salon, agricultural land and a general convenience store in a shopping mall.

Prison and family conditions

Meriam Yahia Ibrahim Ishag was held in Omdurman Federal Women's Prison with Martin Wani, her 20-month-old son. Visitors were Initially not allowed; when her husband finally saw Meriam Ibrahim, she was shackled and had swollen legs. Muslim scholars visited her daily reciting the Koran and trying to pressure her to convert.

Vital medical treatment was refused, and Meriam Ibrahim was denied transfer to a hospital even though she was 8 months into a difficult pregnancy. Even during childbirth, her legs were kept shackled to the floor  and there were fears the baby girl might be permanently disabled due to this. The shackles were removed after the birth.

Mohamed Jar Elnabi, a lawyer representing Meriam Ibrahim, said police and the judge prevented her husband, Wani, going into the court. Elnabi said Wani requires the use of a wheelchair due to muscular dystrophy and "totally depends on her for all details of his life, he cannot live without her". Speaking about the couple's son Martin Wani, Elnabi said, "The couple's son is having a difficult time in prison. He is very affected from being trapped inside a prison from such a young age, he is always getting sick due to lack of hygiene and bugs." Reports that Meriam Ibrahim may be freed were subsequently officially denied. However, on 24 June 2014, Meriam Ibrahim was released on the order of a Sudanese appeal court. The following day, as she and her family were to board a plane to the United States, she and her family were arrested and taken from the airport to Khartoum for questioning. Authorities stated that she was not under arrest, but that the police wished to question her about the validity of a travel document provided to her by South Sudan. Daniel Wani claims in a report from Christian Today the family and supporters were violently handled, the lawyers were beaten and thrown out of the airport. Following their release, the family spent a month in the U.S. embassy in Khartoum.

Defense lawyers

Meriam was represented by five lawyers: Mohaned Mustafa Elnour, Osman Mobarak Musa, Thabit Elzobair Suliman, Elshareef Ali Mohammed, Mohamed Abdunabi. The case has also been taken to the African Commission on people's Human Rights.

Reactions

The United Kingdom government described the sentence as "barbaric" and a UK minister was "truly appalled", noting that Sudan breached international human rights obligations. The United States government was "deeply disturbed" and also called on Sudan to meet its obligations under international human rights law. A joint statement from embassies of Britain, Canada, the Netherlands, and the United States before sentencing also expressed "deep concern", urging "justice and compassion". Daniel Wani, Mariam's husband, has expressed disappointment at a lack of U.S. resoluteness, at the consulate level: "Considering I am an American citizen, I am disappointed with the American Embassy's position from the beginning of the whole case." The lengthy public silence of both President Obama and Secretary of State Kerry on their case drew widespread criticism. Kerry broke this silence on 12 June, after bipartisan lobbying.

Christian groups have been campaigning for Meriam Ibrahim but Islamic extremists also lobbied according to prominent newspaper editor Khalid Tigani.

A lawyer for Meriam Ibrahim said the case would, if necessary, have gone to Sudan's highest Constitutional Court. Sudan's 2005 interim constitution officially guarantees freedom of religion.

The Information Minister of Sudan, Ahmed Bilal Osman, appeared to comment on the court case prior to the appeal, when he said: "It's not only Sudan. In Saudi Arabia, in all the Muslim countries, it is not allowed at all for a Muslim to change his religion."

Christian Solidarity Worldwide, a British-based group working for religious freedom, said Ms. Ishag's case is the latest amongst "a series of repressive acts" against religious minorities in Sudan.

World Council of Churches general secretary, Dr Olav Fykse Tveit considers the sentence unjust and reminds president Omar al-Bashir, the Sudanese constitution guarantees all citizens the "right to the freedom of religious creed and worship".

Amnesty UK's Individuals at Risk Campaigner, Kathy Voss, stated: "There are now three innocent people in that cell. The way Meriam has been treated is sickening, and it has appalled the world. This really is the stuff of nightmares."

British Conservative MP Liam Fox said: "Religious tolerance is something that the UK should be promoting at every opportunity.  We need to ask ourselves whether it is acceptable to be giving taxpayers' money in aid to states which allow treatment such as that handed out to Meriam Ibrahim."

In May 2014, the embassies of the United States, Canada, the United Kingdom and the Netherlands issued a joint statement expressing "deep concern" about the case, urging Sudan to respect the right to freedom of religion. The European Union called for revocation of the "inhuman verdict" and John Kerry urged Sudan to repeal laws banning Muslims from joining other faiths.

Prince Hassan bin Talal of Jordan wrote, "There is no value in worship performed in the absence of free choice and volition."

Amnesty International's Deputy Regional Director Sarah Jackson said: "Today's ruling is a small step to redressing the injustice done to Meriam."

The Italian Prime Minister, Matteo Renzi, mentioned Ibrahim's case in his speech at the European Parliament. After that, The EU passed a Resolution condemning Sudan over treatment of Meriam Ibrahim.

Wider problems
Some have argued that this case may serve as a distraction against complaints the Sudanese people make about their government. Mohamed Ghilan, an expert in Islamic jurisprudence, claims, "The punishment has little to do with religion and serves as a political distraction. This is a ploy by the Sudanese regime to appear as 'defenders of Islam' to mitigate their corruption". Sudan has been noted by the Corruption Perceptions index as being one of the world's most corrupt. However execution is widely prescribed as an appropriate punishment for women and men leaving Islam in Saudi Arabia and in on-line Islamic websites, commonly citing a well attested quotation of Muhammed to Ibn Abbas, "Whoever renounces his religion, kill him." It has, for example, been a view commonly held by young Muslims in the UK, as well as Meriam's own family.

Departure from Sudan
After Meriam and her family took refuge in the US Embassy, the Italian government offered help to speed up the process of getting U.S. passports, given its good relation with Sudan, and vice-minister for foreign affairs Lapo Pistelli flew to the Sudanese capital to that end. Two weeks later vice-minister Pistelli accompanied the family back to Italy on a government plane which took off from Khartoum, and they were welcomed in Rome by Prime Minister Matteo Renzi and Foreign Minister Federica Mogherini.

Pope Francis had expressed "his gratitude and joy" to the Italian Government when he was informed by Renzi of the family's arrival. Later in that day, Meriam and her family met the Pontiff at his residence of Casa Santa Marta in Vatican City for about half an hour, during which she thanked the Catholic Church for their support and prayers, while the Pope thanked her and her family for their "courageous and constant witness of faith".

Post-immigration
The family lived in New Hampshire in the United States for 25 months and moved to Virginia where they live now. Meriam Ibrahim is advocating for other victims of religious persecution and women who face gender based violence and domestic abuse. She is the co-founder and director of Global Mobilization at Tahrir Alnisa foundation.

See also
Freedom of religion in Sudan
Freedom of conscience
Sudanese teddy bear blasphemy case

References

1987 births
Living people
Ethiopian Orthodox Christians
Human rights abuses in Sudan
Sudanese Christians
Sudanese prisoners sentenced to death
Sudanese women
Apostasy in Islam
Amnesty International prisoners of conscience held by Sudan
2010s in Sudan
Persecution of Christians by Muslims
Prisoners sentenced to death by Sudan
Sudanese emigrants to the United States